Daniel Lizars (1754–1812) was an 18th-century Scottish engraver, map-maker and publisher. He was patriarch to the famous Lizars family. He is remembered for his views of Edinburgh.

Life

He was born in Portsburgh, off the Grassmarket in south-west Edinburgh in 1754, the second son of James Lizars, a shoemaker. His brother John Lizars continued the family business as a shoemaker.

He was apprenticed for nine years as a printer and engraver to Andrew Bell. He set up a printworks at the Backstairs on Parliament Close, near to St Giles Cathedral.

In 1798 he apprenticed George Bartholmew, father of the map-making company John Bartholomew and Son Ltd.

He  lived his final years at 7 Duke Street in Edinburgh's New Town. The street was renamed Dublin Street in 1922 and also renumbered. The house is now 13 Dublin Street.

He died on 8 December 1812. He is buried in St Cuthberts Churchyard at the west end of Princes Street Gardens in central Edinburgh. The grave lies on the raised ground immediately south-west of the church.

His premises was burnt down in the Great Fire of Edinburgh in 1824.

Family
He married Margaret Home.

His children  included Daniel Lizars, John Lizars, William Home Lizars and Jane Home Lizars, who later married Sir William Jardine.

References

1754 births
1812 deaths
Publishers (people) from Edinburgh
Scottish engravers
Scottish cartographers